Brucknell may refer to:

Brucknell, Victoria, town in Australia
Kitty Brucknell, singer-songwriter